Mollaömerli is a village in Gülnar district of  Mersin Province, Turkey. At  it is situated in a plateau of Toros Mountains between Gülnar and Büyükeceli . The population of the village was 118  as of 2012. The village was founded in 1850. Main economic activity is farming. Various vegetables are produced.

References

Villages in Gülnar District